The 2006 Polish Film Awards took place on 27 February 2006. It was the 8th edition of Polish Film Awards: Eagles.

Awards nominees and winners
Winners are highlighted in boldface.

Best Film
 Komornik - Janusz Morgenstern
 Jestem - Arthur Reinhart
 Persona non grata - Iwona Ziulkowska

Best Actor
 Komornik - Andrzej Chyra
 Persona non grata - Zbigniew Zapasiewicz
 Skazany na bluesa - Tomasz Kot

Best Actress
 Komornik - Kinga Preis
 Skazany na bluesa - Jolanta Fraszynska
 The Call of the Toad - Krystyna Janda

Supporting Actor
 Persona non grata - Jerzy Stuhr
 The Call of the Toad - Marek Kondrat
 Zakochany aniol - Jerzy Trela

Supporting Actress
 Tulipany - Małgorzata Braunek
 Jestem - Edyta Jungowska
 Skazany na bluesa - Anna Dymna

Film Score
 Persona non grata - Wojciech Kilar
 Jestem - Michael Nyman
 Komornik - Bartlomiej Gliniak
 Skazany na bluesa - Dżem
 Tulipany - Daniel Bloom
 The Call of the Toad - Richard G. Mitchell

Director
 Komornik - Feliks Falk
 Jestem - Dorota Kędzierzawska
 Persona non grata - Krzysztof Zanussi

Screenplay
 Komornik - Grzegorz Loszewski
 Jestem - Dorota Kędzierzawska
 Persona non grata - Krzysztof Zanussi

Cinematography
 Jestem - Arthur Reinhart
 Rozdroze Cafe - Andrzej Ramlau
 Skazany na bluesa - Grzegorz Kuczeriszka
 W dól kolorowym wzgórzem - Jolanta Dylewska

Costume Design
 Skazany na bluesa - Ewa Krauze
 Persona non grata - Jagna Janicka
 Pitbull - Justyna Stolarz

Sound
 Persona non grata - Wieslaw Znyk, Jacek Kusmierczyk
 Mistrz - Jan Freda
 Trzeci - Piotr Domaradzki

Editing
 Persona non grata - Wanda Zeman
 Komornik - Krzysztof Szpetmanski
 Pitbull - Jaroslaw Barzan
 Rozdroze Cafe - Krzysztof Raczynski, Leszek Wosiewicz
 Skazany na bluesa - Cezary Grzesiuk

Production Design
 Komornik - Anna Wunderlich
 Mistrz - Wojciech Zogala
 Persona non grata - Jagna Janicka
 Skazany na bluesa - Joanna Bialousz
 The Call of the Toad - Jochen Schumacher, Robert Czesak

European Film
 My Summer of Love - Paweł Pawlikowski (United Kingdom)
 Knoflíkáři - Petr Zelenka (Czech Republic)
 Kontroll - Nimród Antal (Hungary)

Special awards
 Audience Award: Komornik
 Life Achievement Award: Jerzy Hoffman

External links
 2006 Polish Film Awards at IMDb

Polish Film Awards ceremonies
Polish Film Awards
Polish Film Awards, 2006